The Imperial College Act 1997 is a local Act of the Parliament of the United Kingdom. It is a minor piece of legislation that enabled Imperial College London to take over the Charing Cross and Westminster Medical School, the National Heart and Lung Institute and the Royal Postgraduate Medical School.

In 1988, Imperial College had already taken over St Mary's Hospital Medical School, creating the Imperial College School of Medicine (now the college's Faculty of Medicine), into which these additional medical schools were merged.

The act itself transferred all the property, powers, rights and obligations of the three medical schools to Imperial College. It dissolved the three schools, revoked the charter of the Royal Postgraduate Medical School and repealed the Charing Cross and Westminster Medical School Act 1984. It also restricted the use of the names of the three medical schools: for the 25 years from the passing of the act, only those permitted by Imperial College may use the names.

External links 

History of Imperial College London
United Kingdom Acts of Parliament 1997
1997 in London
Acts of the Parliament of the United Kingdom concerning London
University-related legislation
1997 in education